Kings XI Punjab (KXIP) is a franchise cricket team based in Mohali, India, which plays in the Indian Premier League (IPL). They were one of the eight teams that competed in the 2010 Indian Premier League. They were captained by Mahela Jayawardene. Kings XI Punjab finished last in the IPL and did not qualify for the Champions League T20.

Indian Premier League

Season standings
Kings XI Punjab finished last in the league stage of IPL 2010.

Match log

References

2010 Indian Premier League
Punjab Kings seasons